The 1996 NCAA Division III baseball tournament was played at the end of the 1996 NCAA Division III baseball season to determine the 21st national champion of college baseball at the NCAA Division III level. The tournament concluded with eight teams competing at a new location at Salem Memorial Ballpark in Salem, Virginia, for the championship. Eight regional tournaments were held to determine the participants in the World Series. Regional tournaments were contested in double-elimination format, with one region consisting of six teams, six regions consisting of four teams, and one region consisting of two teams, which was played as best-of-five, for a total of 32 teams participating in the tournament.

References

NCAA Division III Baseball Tournament
Tournament
Baseball competitions in Salem, Virginia
College baseball tournaments in Virginia
1996 in sports in Virginia